NCAA Football Gamebreaker, also known as NCAA Gamebreaker, is an American football game developed by Sony Interactive Studios America and published by Sony for the PlayStation in 1996, exclusively in North America. The cover athlete is the 1995 Heisman winning Ohio State running back Eddie George.

Gameplay
NCAA Gamebreaker is the first 32-bit college football video game published.

Reception
Next Generation reviewed the PlayStation version of the game, rating it four stars out of five, and stated that "Gamebreaker is the best college football game on the market and one of the best football games period."

Reviews
Electronic Gaming Monthly (Sep, 1996)
Game Revolution - Jun 04, 2004
Electronic Gaming Monthly - Oct, 1996
All Game Guide - 1998
IGN - Nov 25, 1996
GameSpot - Dec 01, 1996

References

1996 video games
College football video games
NCAA video games
PlayStation (console) games
PlayStation (console)-only games
Video games developed in the United States